USS Reeves may refer to the following ships of the United States Navy:

 USS Reeves (DE-94), a  delivered to the Royal Navy as 
 , a Buckley-class destroyer escort launched 1943
 , a  destroyer leader launched 1962

United States Navy ship names